Ethmia hemadelpha is a moth in the family Depressariidae. It is found in north-western Australia.

The larvae feed on Ehretia saligna.

References

Moths described in 1903
hemadelpha